The English Hills are a low mountain range in Solano County, California.

The range runs along the southwestern edge of the  Sacramento Valley. Vacaville is at their southern end.

References 

Mountain ranges of Solano County, California
Geography of the Sacramento Valley
Hills of California
Vacaville, California
Mountain ranges of the San Francisco Bay Area
Mountain ranges of Northern California